Dress (stylized as "DRESS") is the twelfth studio album by Japanese singer Shizuka Kudo. It was released on March 19, 1997, through Pony Canyon. The album features a soul and funk-infused rock sound. Musicians Chuei Yoshikawa and Tsuyoshi Kon performed instruments on the album as part of the recording band.

Commercial performance
Dress debuted at number 18 on the Oricon Albums Chart, with 18,000 units sold in its first week. It charted in the top 100 for three weeks and sold a reported total of 31,000 copies during its run.

Track listing

Charts

References

1997 albums
Shizuka Kudo albums
Pony Canyon albums